Ballistic: Ecks vs. Sever (known as Ecks vs. Sever II: Ballistic in Europe) is a first-person shooter video game for the Game Boy Advance handheld game console, developed by Crawfish Interactive and published by BAM! Entertainment in September 2002.  It is the second video game based on the 2002 film Ballistic: Ecks vs. Sever, the first being Ecks vs. Sever.  While that game was based on an early draft of Ecks vs. Sever'''s script, Ballistic'', bearing its ultimate title, is based on its final, theatrical cut.

Reception

The first level of Ecks' campaign was criticized for having a difficult hedge maze that discouraged many gamers. The game reportedly lagged if many enemies and objects were on-screen in certain levels. The sound effects were considered much improved from the first game.

References

2002 video games
First-person shooters
Game Boy Advance-only games
Video games based on films
Video games developed in the United Kingdom
Video games featuring female protagonists
Game Boy Advance games
Video games with 2.5D graphics
Sprite-based first-person shooters
Crawfish Interactive games
Multiplayer and single-player video games